Yulian Pelesh (3 January 1843 – 22 April 1896) was a Ukrainian Greek Catholic hierarch in present-day Ukraine and Poland. He was the first Eparchial Bishop of the new created Ukrainian Catholic Eparchy of Stanislawiw from 1885 to 1891 and the Eparchial Bishop of the Ukrainian Catholic Eparchy of Przemyśl, Sambir and Sanok from 1891 to 1896.

Born in Smerekowiec, Austrian Empire (present day – Lesser Poland Voivodeship, Poland) in the family of cantor-teacher Hryhoriy and his wife Ivanna (née Schavinska) Pelesh in 1843. He was ordained a priest on 20 October 1867 by Bishop Toma Polyanskyi. He served as a prefect in the Theological Seminary in Lviv from 1870 to 1874 and the Rector of the Central Theological Seminary in Vienna from 1875 to 1883.

He was appointed by the Holy See as the first Eparchial Bishop of Ukrainian Catholic Eparchy of Stanislawiw on 27 March 1885 and later transferred as Eparchial Bishop of the Ukrainian Catholic Eparchy of Przemyśl, Sambir and Sanok on 22 September 1891. He was consecrated to the Episcopate on 1 November 1885. The principal consecrator was Metropolitan Sylvester Sembratovych with 2 another co-consecrators.

Bishop Pelesh was the author of monumental Geschichte der Union der ruthenischen Kirche mit Rom (1878-1880) and he died in Przemyśl on 22 April 1896.

References 

1843 births
1896 deaths
People from Gorlice County
People from the Kingdom of Galicia and Lodomeria
19th-century Eastern Catholic bishops
Bishops of the Ukrainian Greek Catholic Church
Bishops in Austria–Hungary
Bishops of Przemyśl